Graham White may refer to:
 Graham White (swimmer) (born 1951), Australian freestyle swimmer
 Graham White (priest) (1884–1945), Archdeacon of Singapore, 1931–1945
 Graham White (politician) (1880–1965), radical British Liberal Party politician
 Graham White (rugby league), Australian rugby league player

See also
Claude Grahame-White, English aviator (1879–1959) 
Grahame-White, a British aircraft and motorcar manufacturing company